Timo Peltomaa (born 26 July 1968) is a Finnish former professional ice hockey player. He competed in the men's tournament at the 1992 Winter Olympics.

Career statistics

Regular season and playoffs

International

References

External links
 

1968 births
Living people
Olympic ice hockey players of Finland
Ice hockey players at the 1992 Winter Olympics
People from Akaa
Ilves players
Augsburger Panther players
Frankfurt Lions players
Los Angeles Kings draft picks
Sportspeople from Pirkanmaa